The 2019–20 season was Hibernian's third consecutive season in the top tier of Scottish football, the Scottish Premiership, having been promoted from the Scottish Championship at the end of the 2016–17 season. Hibs finished seventh in the league, which was curtailed due to the COVID-19 pandemic. They lost to Celtic in the semi-finals of the League Cup and Hearts in the semi-finals of the Scottish Cup.

Sir Tom Farmer sold his majority ownership of Hibs in July 2019 to American businessman Ronald Gordon, who became chairman of the club.

Results and fixtures

Friendly matches

Scottish Premiership

Despite winning their opening match, Hibs got off to a poor start to the league season. After they lost the first Edinburgh derby of the season, Hibs fan Irvine Welsh claimed that they were "favourites" for relegation.

Hibs eventually finished in seventh place. They had been in sixth place when the league season was suspended on 13 March due to the COVID-19 pandemic, but were awarded seventh place due to St Johnstone having a slightly higher points average.

League Cup

Hibs entered the 2019–20 Scottish League Cup at the group stage, and a 2–0 win at Elgin City in their final match clinched a place in the last 16. Elgin player Kane Hester was booked during the match; he was later charged with conspiring to con betting company Bet365 by placing bets that he would receive a yellow card, but was found not proven.

Hibs were drawn at home to Championship club Greenock Morton in the last 16. Hibs needed extra time to defeat Morton and reach the quarter-finals, where they were drawn away to Kilmarnock. By winning a penalty shootout Hibs progressed to the semi-finals, where they were paired with holders Celtic.

Hibs lost 5–2 to Celtic in the semi-final. Two days later, and with the team sitting in 10th place in the league, head coach Paul Heckingbottom was sacked by Hibs.

Scottish Cup

Hibs were drawn away to Championship leaders Dundee United in the fourth round. They won that tie after a replay and were then drawn with Lowland League (fifth tier) side BSC Glasgow. A 4–1 win put Hibs into the quarter-final, where they were given a home draw against Championship side Inverness Caledonian Thistle. Inverness were the only club from outside the Premiership to have reached the quarter-final.

A 5–2 win against Inverness gave Hibs a place in the semi-final, which produced an Edinburgh derby with Hearts. That match was originally scheduled for 11 April, but was postponed due to the coronavirus pandemic. On 21 July, the Scottish Football Association announced that the semi-finals would be played on the weekend of 31 October / 1 November 2020. Hibs lost 2–1 after extra time in the semi-final, with Kevin Nisbet missing a penalty moments before Hearts scored their winning goal (also from a penalty).

Player statistics

|-
! colspan=11 style=background:#dcdcdc; text-align:center| Goalkeepers
|-

|-
! colspan=11 style=background:#dcdcdc; text-align:center| Defenders
|-

|-
! colspan=11 style=background:#dcdcdc; text-align:center| Midfielders
|-

|-
! colspan=11 style=background:#dcdcdc; text-align:center| Forwards
|-

|-
! colspan=16 style=background:#dcdcdc; text-align:center| Signed in 2020–21
|-

Notes

Club statistics

League table

Division summary

League Cup group table

Management statistics

Transfers
Including the expiry of loans, 12 first team players left Hibs after the 2018–19 season ended. Scott Allan had already been signed on a pre-contract agreement. After Josh Vela was signed in mid-July, manager Paul Heckingbottom said that his recruitment was complete "unless something unforeseen happens". After winger Martin Boyle suffered a knee injury, Glenn Middleton was signed on loan from Rangers.

Players in

Players out

Loans in

Loans out

See also
List of Hibernian F.C. seasons

Notes

References

2019-20
Scottish football clubs 2019–20 season